Wikipedia has articles relating to two separate ecoregion classification systems:

Ecoregions defined by the Commission for Environmental Cooperation and partner agencies in Canada, Mexico, and the United States:
List of ecoregions in North America (CEC)
List of ecoregions in the United States (EPA)
Ecoregions of the world defined by the conservation group World Wildlife Fund:
Global 200 ecoregions (WWF), 238 single or combined ecoregions identified by the World Wildlife Fund (WWF) as priorities for conservation.
List of terrestrial ecoregions (WWF) 867 terrestrial ecoregions.
List of marine ecoregions (WWF), 232 marine ecoregions of the coastal and continental shelf areas.
List of freshwater ecoregions (WWF), 426 freshwater ecoregions. 
Lists of ecoregions by country